The 1924 AAA Championship Car season consisted of 9 races, beginning in Beverly Hills, California on February 24 and concluding in Culver City, California on December 14.  The AAA National Champion was Jimmy Murphy and the Indianapolis 500 winners were L. L. Corum and Joe Boyer.

Schedule and results
All races running on Dirt/Brick/Board Oval.

 Shared drive

Leading National Championship standings

† Murphy was killed at the Syracuse race on September 15

References

See also
 1924 Indianapolis 500

AAA Championship Car season
AAA Championship Car
1924 in American motorsport